Emmanuelle Pireyre is a French writer. She was born in Clermont-Ferrand in 1969. She was first published in 1995. She is best known for her 2012 book Féerie générale which won the Prix Médicis. She now lives in Lyon.

References

21st-century French writers
Prix Médicis winners
1969 births
Living people
Writers from Clermont-Ferrand